The Liberation Class was a class of 2-8-0 steam locomotives designed for heavy freight work in post-Second World War Europe. 120 were built by the Vulcan Foundry of Newton-le-Willows in 1946.

Design
They shared some features with the earlier WD Austerity 2-8-0 and WD Austerity 2-10-0 which in turn had been based on the LMS Stanier Class 8F.  They were however built to the continental loading gauge, but the design was intended to last, not a short-term kriegslok.

Distribution
Ten went to Luxembourg and the rest to Eastern Europe. The United Nations Relief and Rehabilitation Administration distributed them as follows:
 10 to as Luxembourg as  CFL class 47
 65 to Yugoslavia as  JŽ class 38; Đuro Đaković built 10 more 1957–1958
 30 to Poland as  PKP class Tr202
 15 Czechoslovakia as  ČSD class 459.0

Preservation
One liberation class locomotive remains in Krakow, Poland TR202-19 built in 1946.
A second (also not in working condition) is in Jaworzyna Slask, Lower Silesia, South West Poland Tr202-28.

References

External links 

 Tr202
 CFL class 47
 Vulcan Foundry Publicity Leaflet on the Liberation Class

Freight locomotives
Vulcan Foundry locomotives
2-8-0 locomotives
Railway locomotives introduced in 1946
Steam locomotives of Czechoslovakia
Steam locomotives of Luxembourg
Steam locomotives of Poland
Steam locomotives of Yugoslavia
Standard gauge locomotives of Yugoslavia
Standard gauge locomotives of Czechoslovakia
Standard gauge locomotives of Luxembourg
Standard gauge locomotives of Poland
Chemins de fer luxembourgeois locomotives
Czechoslovak State Railways locomotives
Polish State Railways steam locomotives